The International Plastic Modellers' Society (often shortened to IPMS) is an international organisation of hobbyists interested in building plastic model kits. The Society is made up of national branches, and within these, local clubs who usually represent a town, city or locality. The first branch was established in the United Kingdom in 1963.

Local clubs organise regular meetings, typically once a month for members to meet up, show off their latest models, discuss the hobby and work on ongoing projects. Many also organise their own annual shows and invite fellow clubs to display alongside traders, and together, these shows make up a busy calendar of events throughout each year. The UK has the most developed club network, with organisations covering virtually the whole country. Elsewhere, local clubs can often function as national branches simultaneously, such as IPMS Argentina who also represent the Mar del Plata region of the country.

At a higher level, national branches will also organise their own shows. These are typically termed 'Nationals'. The largest of these is IPMS UK's Scale ModelWorld, held at Telford in November each year and features not just local British club displays, but also contributions from overseas branches and clubs, such is its scale.

In addition to the branch and club structure, Special Interest Groups (SIG) exist which focus on a specific area or type of model building, for instance a particular aircraft such as the Tornado, a time period like the Cold War, a manufacturer such as Airfix or a genre like science fiction and fantasy. SIGs often transcend club and branch boundaries, being made up of modellers from around the world sharing a common interest. As a result, most SIGs do not meet up on a regular basis like clubs, but instead communicate more frequently online.

UK SIGs
List of current UK SIGs on IPMS UK website

IPMS (USA) SIGs 

List of current SIGs

National branches

See also
Similar societies
Armor Modeling and Preservation Society (AMPS)

Models and model building
list of model aircraft manufacturers.
Kitbashing, creating a model by combining different kits.
Model military vehicles
Ship models, some of which are plastic kits.
Gundam Models, plastic models of Japanese science fiction.

Manufacturers
Tamiya Corporation
Academy Plastic Model Co.
Revell
Aoshima Bunka Kyozai Co.
Dragon Models Limited DML.
Hasegawa
Kyosho
Airfix
Reamsa

External links
IPMS Farnborough club site
IPMS Middleton Cheney club site
IPMS Vancouver club site

Scale modeling
Hobbyist organizations
1963 establishments in the United Kingdom